The Fender Bullet was an electric guitar originally designed by John Page and manufactured and marketed by the Fender Musical Instruments Corporation. It was first introduced as a line of "student" guitars to replace the outgoing Mustang and Musicmaster models.

History
The Bullet was designed by luthier John Page who explained the origin of the silver star on the Bullets head stock:

"When I designed the Bullet I was still giggin' a lot and still reading the trades... like Billboard. The Billboard charts always had a silver star around the number of singles/albums that were shooting up the charts quickly. They were usually the "hits" So I thought that the phrase "Number one with a bullet" which was a classic DJ/industry phrase, would be a great advertising campaign for it. Fender marketing chose not to go with it... so the decal never made any sense. But what was funny, as a side note, the very next NAMM show after I released it, an import company... maybe Tokai or Hondo, basically ripped off the design and called it the All Star... silver star with the numeral one in it and all."

USA Version 1 (1981)
Fender marketed two models, initially manufacture was set up offshore in Korea, but due to technical issues, such as unacceptable high actions, the guitars were recalled to the U.S.A for manufacture at the Fullerton plant.

Two models were available - The "Bullet" (known as The standard Bullet) & the "Bullet Deluxe", retailers & dealers in the USA often called the guitars "The Bullet One" but this was never a marketing name used by Fender. The "1" on the headstock was devised by John Page as an ad campaign as in "#1 with a bullet" like in Billboard with a silver star. These two models had a single cutaway body style similar to that of the Fender Telecaster, but much smaller, closer in size to the Mustang and Duo-Sonic that the Bullet replaced; the guitar had a 21 fret rosewood neck and Telecaster-style headstock and Kluson Deluxe tuners. Similarly to preceding student models like the Mustang, Bronco and Musicmaster, cost savings were made by using less wood for the body; both guitar bodies were 1 5/8 inches thick, as opposed to the 1 3/4 inch thickness of other Fender guitars; parts were quick to assemble and labor saving, both models had the same hardware & electrics as other Fender guitars from the same era. The standard model originally retailed at $199.00 or $249 including the vacuum formed case, cord, strap, polishing cloth & bridge adjustment wrenches. The Bullet Deluxe had a plastic pickguard with a separate, traditional hardtail bridge while the standard model featured a steel pickguard-bridge-tailpiece combo, powder coated white or black, with separate saddles for each string. Both models had 2 single coil pickups with a three-way selector switch. The pickups had the same closed pickup covers as used on the Mustang & were initially left over Mustang stock. Color options were red or ivory, with white or black pick guards on both models. At release in 1981, the only neck option was maple with a rosewood fretboard; a maple neck with a walnut skunk stripe was introduced in 1982 alongside the rosewood fretboard on both "The Bullet" & "The Bullet Deluxe".

USA Version 2 (1982–1983)
In 1982, Fender introduced a revised version of the Bullet , including two bass models. This series featured a double cutaway body similar but much smaller than the Fender Stratocaster without body contouring and therefore almost the same shape as the Mustang and Duo-Sonic that the Bullet replaced. Maple was the only neck option and the headstock retained the version one telecaster profile. Due to Kluson going out of business in 1981, Fender introduced the 70's style F tuners on the 1982 Bullets and used the Fender logo, sealed tuners on the 1983 Bullet; both tuners were made by Schaller in W. Germany. Five models were marketed - the Bullet (standard), the Bullet H-1, the Bullet S-2, S-3, and H-2—in addition to the two new bass models (a regular scale "B-34" and short scale "B-30"). The Bullet (standard) had the patented steel pickguard-bridge-tailpiece combo with two single coil pickups and a 3 way switch. The H-1 sported the same steel pickguard-bridge-tailpiece combo with one humbucker pickup; it also had a coil tap button to split the humbucker to single coil. The S-2, S-3 & H-2 were marketed as Deluxe versions & had a white plastic 3-ply pickguard with a separate hardtail bridge, in 1983 a single ply pickguard was introduced with the model number S-2, S-3 or H-2 embossed on the lower horn. The S-2 had two single coil pickups & a 3-way switch, the S-3 had 3 single coil pickups & a 5-way switch, the H-2 had two humbucker pickups each with their own coil tapping button & a 3-way switch. The humbucker pickups were really two single coil pickups with alnico rod magnets side-by-side. The basses each had plastic guards and traditional bridges. They had the old Mustang bass style pickups. They differed only in scale. The popular second version Bullet were available in color options of red, ivory, brown sunburst, or walnut; black was also available but never marketed as a color option.  The S-2 was notably featured in the music video for Twisted Sister's "We're Not Gonna Take It," used by the son of Mark Metcalf's character to blow him out of the window when the song begins. Fender ceased production of Bullet guitars at the end of 1983, and the model was never produced again in the USA. Production of the Bullet range moved to Japan, under the Squier name.

Squier Bullet

1983–2007

Late 1983 to 1984 the Bullet manufacture was moved to Japan (SQ serial number pre-fix), these guitars were also known as "Bullet One" in the USA by dealers & retailers, but never marketed as such. The guitars had solid wood bodies, good quality pick-ups and hardware but no longer had string through bodies. A hard tail bridge and later a six screw vintage style trem bridge was offered. The guitars featured 3 Single coils or 2 Humbucking pickups like the original USA-made "Bullet" guitars, but steel rods were used as pole pieces with a ceramic bar magnet; the humbucker version consisted of the same paired single coil configuration as the American-made models. In 1985, 86 and 87 production was again moved, this time to Korea to reduce costs (E serial number pre-fix stamped on the neck plate). These guitars were marketed as the Squier Bullet and used plywood bodies. The neck was a rosewood board on maple and had a Strat headstock with a Telecaster style heel, three single coil pickup pattern like the Stratocaster, as well as a low cost two point tremolo. These were available in Red or Black.
       
In 1984/85 there was a Squier Bullet guitar model manufactured in Japan that featured a full sized Strat-style body made of solid wood. This particular Squier Bullet model is also distinguished by the fact that it featured a two pickup configuration (neck and bridge) instead of the usual three pickup, a Stratocaster style headstock with Telecaster style heel shape, jack socket located on the pickguard, 2 knobs (one volume, one tone), and a top-load hard tail or two point trem. It was offered in two colors, ivory and black.

In 1986 Squier released the contemporary HST ( Hybrid Strat/Tele ) Bullet, E prefix serial on the neck plate, the guitar had a more pointy shaped telecaster style body with 3 pickups HSS configuration (Humbucker, single coil, single coil), a rosewood board on maple neck with a strat shaped headstock, no pickguard & a two pivot tremolo, this was a budget guitar aimed at the Heavy Metal market & was available in ivory or Black. This guitar had no country of origin mark,but it is known the guitar was made in  Korea, the overall build quality is reasonably good but the body was plywood, as the serial is an E prefix it Korean as all Japanese models had the SQ prefix.

In 1989 Squier introduced a revamped version of the contemporary HST Bullet, this guitar did feature "Made in Korea" on the headstock with an E prefix serial & is exactly the same as the guitar above but it had a strat shaped body, also available in ivory or black.

2005–present
Squier introduced a new, Chinese-made Bullet Strat in 2005, sporting a built-in tremolo arm, rosewood fingerboard, and one of six body finishes (Pink, Arctic White, Daphne Blue, Fiesta Red, Brown Sunburst, or Black) with a single-ply white pickguard.

By 2015, Fender was using Squier Bullet as a line name for their lowest-priced guitars at the $150 price point. The guitars used inexpensive basswood for their bodies and reduced paint steps to the absolute minimum to keep costs under control. However, they used the same pickups and tuners as their slightly more expensive Affinity series cousins, and generally were acknowledged as good starter instruments. In 2018, Fender had done away with the vibrato bridge on the Bullet line and made its mainline Bullet guitars top-loading hardtail instruments (vibrato bridges could still be found on special production runs for stores such as Guitar Center). The Stratocaster headstocks say "Bullet® Strat®," while the Mustang headstocks simply have an all-black version of the Squier Mustang logo used on the more-expensive Vintage Modified instruments.

As of Summer NAMM 2018, Fender's Squier Bullet line consisted of:
 Squier Mini Strat (SSS, 22.75" short-scale)
 Squier Bullet Stratocaster (SSS, 25.5" scale)
 Squier Bullet Stratocaster (HSS, 25.5" scale)
 Squier Bullet Mustang (HH, 24" short-scale)

The Squier Bullet Special
From around 1999 to 2005, Fender produced a single pickup Squier Bullet Special guitar. It had a fixed, hardtail bridge, a dual-coil (humbucker) bridge pickup, one volume control, and a 21 fret rosewood fingerboard bolt on neck. The body was made out of plywood and it was made in six colors: Black, Ice Blue Metallic, Red Metallic, Cobalt Blue Metallic, Orange, and Satin Silver. The Red and Orange bodies were made with black hardware; all other colors had chrome hardware. All Bullet Specials had a 1 ply black pickguard. Most of the Squier Bullet Specials made in 2002 came with a special 20th Anniversary engraved neck plate. The logo on the headstock reads "Squier Bullet" with no mention of "Special". Some 2002 versions of the black and Frost Red Metallic Squier Bullet Special are known to have the Affinity brand on the headstock as well.

All Squier Bullet Special guitars were made in Indonesia at the Cort factory. The serial numbers start with IC followed by two digits that designate the year the guitar was made. The remaining digits indicate month of production, color, and sequence. IC02xxxxxxx indicates a guitar made in 2002.

Bullet Strings
Fender also markets guitar strings under the Bullet brand. Introduced in the early 1970s, these strings differ by having cylindrical bullet-shaped ends instead of the "ball ends" common to other manufacturers. Fender states the bullet ends create a tighter fit in the tremolo block on Stratocaster guitars, leading to greater tuning stability when the tremolo is used. In the early 1990s Fender switched from using zinc-plated steel for the bullet ends to brass, improving sustain. Today nickel is also used. Stainless steel strings with bullet ends are also offered since the late '90s.

References

Further reading
 Fjestad, Zachary R. (Editor), The Blue Book of Electric Guitars; (9th Edition), 2005
 Peter Bertges: The Fender Reference; Bomots, Saarbrücken 2007,

External links
 "Fender Bullet Owners Club"

Bullet
1981 musical instruments
Musical instruments invented in the 1980s